País do Desejo is a 2012 Brazilian-Portuguese drama film directed by Paulo Caldas.	
The film premiered at the 35th São Paulo International Film Festival.

The film is based in the case of a girl from Alagoinha, in Pernambuco. In 2009, the girl became pregnant after years of sexual abuse committed by the stepfather. As the pregnancy was the result of a rape and represented a risk to the life of the girl, she did an abortion, as is provided for in the Brazilian legislation.

The story is told from the center of the crisis of a Catholic priest that is positioned against the decision of the Archbishop of the Church to excommunicate the mother, the girl and the doctors involved in the abortion.

Plot 
The film tells the story of Roberta, a famous classical pianist who faces a tough battle against a severe kidney disease, and José, a somewhat unconventional priest, which supports a 12-year-old girl raped by her uncle and pregnant with twins, to have an abortion.

The fate of the two characters crosses when Roberta faints at a concert and is hospitalized in a local clinic, belonging to the brother of the priest. Gradually, he is interested by the pianist, and that love will change their destiny in many ways.

Cast 
 Maria Padilha as Roberta
 Fábio Assunção as Father José
 Germano Haiut as Dr. Orlando
 Gabriel Braga Nunes as César

See also
2009 Brazilian girl abortion case

References

External links
 

Abortion in Brazil
Portuguese drama films
Brazilian drama films
Films shot in Olinda
Films shot in Recife
Films based on actual events
Films about Catholic priests
Films about abortion
Precocious puberty and pregnancy
2010s Portuguese-language films
Films about rape